Portugal is a country in southwestern Europe.  

Portugal may also refer to:

Places
 Portugal (European Parliament constituency), coterminous with the country
 Kingdom of Portugal, in existence from 1139 to 1910
 County of Portugal, two medieval counties
 Continental Portugal, the mainland area of the country
 Portugal Cove–St. Philip's, a town in Newfoundland and Labrador, Canada 
 3933 Portugal, an asteroid

Other uses
 Portugal (surname)
 Portugal (film), 2018 film by Lauri Lagle

See also
 :Category:National sports teams of Portugal for teams called "Portugal"
 Portugal national football team
 Portugal. The Man, American psychedelic rock band
 Little Portugal (disambiguation)
 Portuguese (disambiguation)
 Poortugaal, a village in the Netherlands
 Portugalete, a town in the Basque Country, Spain
 Porthcawl, a town on the south coast of Wales